Grant Hill (born 1972) is an American former basketball player and co-owner and executive of the Atlanta Hawks.

Grant Hill may also refer to:

 Grant Hill (politician) (born 1943), Canadian politician
 Grant Hill (producer) (active 1994 and after), Australian film producer
 Grant Hill (New York), an elevation in Oneida County, New York
 Grant Hill, San Diego, an urban neighborhood in central San Diego, California

See also 
 Grants Hill Lake, a lake in Nova Scotia, Canada
 Hill (surname)
 All pages with titles containing "Grant Hill"